Khasraj-e Razi Mohammad (also Romanized as Khasraj-e Rāz̤ī Moḩammad) is a village in Seyyed Abbas Rural District, Shavur District, Shush County, Khuzestan Province, Iran. At the 2006 census, its population was 761, in 134 families.

References 

Populated places in Shush County